Don or Donald Nichols or Nicholls could refer to: 

Donald Nichols (American football) (1901-1978), American college football player and attorney
Donald Nichols (spy) (1923-1992), U.S. Air Force officer
Donald G. Nichols, member of the Florida House of Representatives
Don Nichols (1924-2017), American motorsport entrepreneur
Donald Nicholls, Baron Nicholls of Birkenhead (1933-2019), British barrister and Law Lord
Don Nicholls (born 1936), Australian rules footballer

See also
Don Nickles (born 1946), former U.S. senator from Oklahoma